Auditory neuropathy (AN) is a hearing disorder in which the outer hair cells of the cochlea are present and functional, but sound information is not transmitted sufficiently by the auditory nerve to the brain. Hearing loss with AN can range from normal hearing sensitivity to profound hearing loss.

A neuropathy usually refers to a disease of the peripheral nerve or nerves, but the auditory nerve itself is not always affected in auditory neuropathy spectrum disorders. Prevalence in the population is relatively unknown. Neonates with high risk factors for hearing loss have a prevalence of up to 40% (Vignesh, Jaya, & Muraleedharan 2016). These high-risk factors are: hypoxia, low birth weight, premature birth, hyperbilirubinemia, jaundice, and aminoglycoside antibiotic treatments (NIDCD, 2018).

Possible sites of lesion 

Based on clinical testing of subjects with auditory neuropathy, the disruption in the stream of sound information has been localized to one or more of three probable locations: the inner hair cells of the cochlea, the synapse between the inner hair cells and the auditory nerve, or a lesion of the ascending auditory nerve itself.

Diagnosing auditory neuropathy

Diagnosis is possible after a test battery, that must necessarily include the following: the auditory brainstem response and otoacoustic emissions. Auditory brainstem response should be tested with both polarities (helps in identifying cochlear microphonics).

Auditory Neuropathy can be diagnosed with a battery of tests including Otoacoustic Emissions (OAE), Auditory Brainstem Response (ABR), and acoustic reflexes. The classic AN paradigm would include present OAEs indicating normal outer hair cell function, absent or abnormal ABR with presence of the cochlear microphonic, and absent acoustic reflexes. Other tests would include pure-tone and speech audiometry. AN patients can have a range of hearing thresholds with difficulty in speech perception. Patients with auditory neuropathy spectrum disorders have to date never been shown to have normal middle ear muscle reflexes at 95 dB HL or less despite having normal otoacoustic emissions.
  
Auditory neuropathy can occur spontaneously, or in combination with diseases like Charcot-Marie-Tooth disease and Friedreich's ataxia. AN can have either congenital or acquired causes. AN can be due to genetic factors in syndromic, non-syndromic, and mitochondrial related patterns. Approximately 40% of AN cases are estimated to have a genetic cause.

It appears that regardless of the audiometric pattern (hearing thresholds) or of their function on traditional speech testing in quiet the vast majority of those affected have very poor hearing in background noise situations.

Residual auditory function 

When testing the auditory system, there really is no characteristic presentation on the audiogram.

When diagnosing someone with auditory neuropathy, there is no characteristic level of functioning either. People can present relatively little dysfunction other than problems of hearing speech in noise, or can present as completely deaf and gaining no useful information from auditory signals.

Hearing aids are sometimes prescribed, with mixed success.

FM systems in combination with hearing aids or cochlear implants could increase success of these amplification devices.

Some people with auditory neuropathy obtain cochlear implants, also with mixed success.

Screening 

Universal Newborn Hearing Screenings are mandated in a majority of the United States. In most parts of Australia, hearing screening via AABR testing is mandated, meaning that essentially all congenital (i.e., not those related to later onset degenerative disorders) auditory neuropathy cases should be diagnosed at birth.

Auditory neuropathy is sometimes difficult to catch right away, even with these precautions in place. Parental suspicion of a hearing loss is a trustworthy screening tool for hearing loss, too; if it is suspected, that is sufficient reason to seek a hearing evaluation from an audiologist.

See also

Auditory neuropathy spectrum disorder
Auditory processing disorder
Cochlear implant
Sensorineural hearing impairment

References

Further reading

External links
Auditory neuropathy: What is it and what can we do about it? from the LSU Medical School
Auditory Neuropathy Information site
Auditory Neuropathy by Timothy C. Hain
https://www.nidcd.nih.gov/health/auditory-neuropathy
https://www.audiology.org/tags/auditory-neuropathy-spectrum-disorder-ansd
http://www.asha.org/auditory-neuropathy
Auditory Neuropathy. (2018, March 16). Retrieved from https://www.nidcd.nih.gov/health/auditory-      neuropathy
Interacoustics. (2016). Cochlear Microphonics CM. Retrieved from               https://www.interacoustics.com/guides/test/abr-tests/cochlear-microphonics-cm

Audiology
Deafness